A century is a period of 100 years.

Century, The Century or Centuries may also refer to:

Arts, entertainment and media

Broadcasting
Century Network, a former group of independent local radio stations in England
Century Radio, a former national commercial radio station in Ireland

Film and television
Century (film), a 1993 British film
The Century: America's Time, a 1999 American documentary

Literature
Century (book), a 1999 coffee table book 
Century (novel), by Fred Mustard Stewart, 1981
The Century (book), a 2005 non-fiction book by Alain Badiou
The Century (newspaper), in Nellis Air Force Base in Las Vegas, 1960–1980
Century Dictionary, an encyclopedic dictionary of the English language
The Century Magazine, an American magazine 1881–1930
The League of Extraordinary Gentlemen, Volume III: Century, a comic series
Magdeburg Centuries, an ecclesiastical history first published 1559–1574

Music
Century (American band), a metalcore band
Century (French band), a French rock band
"Century" (song), by The Long Blondes, 2008
"Century", a song by Feist from the 2017 album Pleasure
"Century", a 1991 song by Intastella
"Century", a song by Big Thief from the 2019 album U.F.O.F.
"Centuries" (song), by Fall Out Boy, 2014

Other uses in arts and entertainment
Century (comics), a Marvel Comics character
 Century: Spice Road, a 2017 table-top strategy game

Businesses and organisations
Century, an imprint of Random House
Century Aluminum, an American producer of primary aluminium
Century Building Society, a Scottish building society 
Century Casinos, an American gaming company 
Century Properties, a real estate company in the Philippines
Century Time Gems, Swiss watch maker
The Century Company, an American publisher 1881–1933
Century College, in White Bear Lake, Minnesota, U.S.
Century High School (disambiguation)

Places
Century, Florida, U.S.
Century, West Virginia, U.S., a town in the United States
Centuries, Hythe, a house in Kent, England
The Century (Los Angeles), a condominium skyscraper in Century City, California, U.S.
The Century (Central Park West, Manhattan), an apartment building

Sports
Century (cricket), a score of 100 or more runs in a single innings by a batter
Century break in snooker, a score of 100 points or more in one visit at the table without missing a shot
Century ride, a road cycling ride of 100 miles

Transportation
Century (ship), the lead cruise ship of the Century-class
Century-class ferry, of BC Ferries, the only one of which is MV Skeena Queen
Century (automobile), an early electric vehicle 1911–15
Buick Century, the model name of several cars
Toyota Century, a luxury sedan car
Century Series, a group of American fighter aircraft between F-100 and F-106

Other uses
Century plant, Agave americana, a species of flowering plant 
Century type family, a family of serif type faces

See also

Century Building (disambiguation)
Century City (disambiguation)
Century House (disambiguation)
Century Park (disambiguation)
Century Theatre (disambiguation)
Century Tower (disambiguation)
List of centuries, and millenniums
Centuria, a Latin term for military units consisting of (originally) 100 men, and a Roman unit of land area 
Centaurium or centaury, a genus of species in the gentian family